Sergio Crevatin (born 28 May 1980) is an Argentine handball player. He plays for SAG LOMAS and competed for the Argentine national team at the 2015 World Men's Handball Championship in Qatar.

References

1980 births
Living people
Argentine male handball players
Handball players at the 2003 Pan American Games
Handball players at the 2007 Pan American Games
Handball players at the 2015 Pan American Games
Pan American Games medalists in handball
Pan American Games silver medalists for Argentina
Medalists at the 2015 Pan American Games
21st-century Argentine people